This is a comprehensive list of awards and nominations won by Jagadguru Rambhadracharya. Rambhadracharya is a Hindu religious leader, Sanskrit scholar, writer and commentator and Katha artist based in Chitrakoot, India.

Rambhadracharya is the head of Tulsi Peeth, and the lifelong chancellor of the Jagadguru Rambhadracharya Handicapped University. Rambhadracharya has been blind since the age of two months, but has never used Braille or any other aid to learn or compose. He can speak 22 languages. He has authored more than 90 books and 50 papers. He is regarded as one of the greatest authorities on Tulsidas in India, and is the editor of a critical edition of the Ramcharitmanas. He is a Katha artist for the Ramayana and the Bhagavata. His Katha programmes are held regularly in different cities in India and other countries, and are telecast on television channels like Sanskar TV and Sanatan TV.

Rambhadracharya has been honoured by several personalities and politicians, including A. P. J. Abdul Kalam, Somnath Chatterjee, Shilendra Kumar Singh, M. Channa Reddy, P. N. Bhagwati, Ramesh Chandra Lahoti, Morari Bapu, Joseph Kurien and Indira Gandhi.

In 2015, Rambhadracharya was awarded Padma Vibhushan, India's second highest civilian honour. He won the Sahitya Akademi Award for Sanskrit, the Shreevani Alankaran, the Banabhatta award and the Vachaspati award for his epic Śrībhārgavarāghavīyam. He has received eight gold medals in Shastri and Acharya examinations.

Awards and honors bestowed on Rambhadracharya are listed below.

Awards
Before Vairagi initiation
 1974. Five gold medals at the Akhila Bharatiya Sanskrit Adhiveshan (All India Sanskrit Conference), New Delhi. Presented by Indira Gandhi, then Prime Minister of India.
 1974. Gold Medal, Shastri (Bachelor of Arts) examination, awarded by the Sampurnanand Sanskrit University, Varanasi.
 1976. Gold medal for standing first in all-India Sanskrit debate competition. Presented by M. Channa Reddy, then Governor of Uttar Pradesh.
 1976. Cancellor's Gold Medal, awarded by the Sampurnanand Sanskrit University, Varanasi.
 1976. Seven gold medals, Acharya (Master of Arts) examination, awarded by the Sampurnanand Sanskrit University, Varanasi.

After Vairagi initiation
 1999. Kaviraj Vidya Narayan Shastri Archana-Samman Award, awarded by the Kaviraj Vidya Narayan Shastri Archana-Samman Committee, Bhagalpur, Bihar, for contributions to the Sanskrit language.
 2000. Vishishta Puraskar, awarded by the Uttar Pradesh Sanskrit Samsthana, Lucknow.
 2003. Rajshekhar Samman, awarded by the Madhya Pradesh Sanskrit Academy, Bhopal, for the Śrīrāghavakṛpābhāṣyam commentary on the Prasthanatrayi.
 2003. Bhaurao Deoras Award, awarded by the Bhaurao Deoras Seva Nyas, Lucknow. He was given citations, traditional dresses and an award of Rs 58,000. Awarded at a simple function organised at the Saraswati Kunj in Nirala Nagar on March 17.
 2003. Diwaliben Award for Progress in Religion, awarded by the Dewaliben Mehta Charitable Trust, Mumbai. Presented by P. N. Bhagwati, former Chief Justice of India.
 2003. Ativishishta Puraskar, by the Uttar Pradesh Sanskrit Samsthana, Lucknow.
 2004.  President's Certificate of Honour or Badarayana Puraskar. Presented by A. P. J. Abdul Kalam, then President of India.
 2005. Sahitya Akademi Award in Sanskrit for the epic Śrībhārgavarāghavīyam.
 2006. Shreevani Alankaran, awarded by the Jaydayal Dalmiya Shri Vani Trust for the epic Śrībhārgavarāghavīyam. Presented by Somnath Chatterjee, then Speaker of the Lok Sabha.
 2006. Banabhatta Award, awarded by Madhya Pradesh Sanskrit Board, Bhopal, for the epic Śrībhārgavarāghavīyam.
 2007. Goswami Tulsidas Samarchan Samman, awarded by the Tulsi Research Institute, Municipal Corporation, Allahabad. Presented by Ramesh Chandra Lahoti, former Chief Justice of India.
 2007. Vachaspati Award, awarded by the K. K. Birla Foundation, New Delhi, for the epic Śrībhārgavarāghavīyam. It carried a prize money of one lakh rupees. Presented by Shilendra Kumar Singh, then Governor of Rajasthan.
 2011. Tulsi Award 2011, awarded by Morari Bapu on the eve of Tulsi Jayanti, anniversary of the birth of Tulsidas.
 2011. Dev Bhumi Award, awarded by the Government of Himachal Pradesh, Shimla. Presented by Joseph Kurien, then Chief Justice of Himachal Pradesh High Court.

Honors
 1998. Dharmachakravarti, awarded by the World Religious Parliament, New Delhi, in recognition of meritorious contribution to world development.
 1999. Mahakavi, awarded by the Akhil Bharatiya Hindi Bhasha Sammelan, Bhagalpur, Bihar, for invaluable contributions to the popularisation and enrichment of Hindi language, literature, and culture.
 2000. Mahamahopadhyay, conferred by the Lal Bahadur Shastri Sanskrit Vidyapeeth, New Delhi. Presented by Maharaj Krishnakav, the then Education Secretary of Ministry of Human Resource Development at the fourth convocation of the university on February 11.
 2002. Kavikularatna, awarded by Sampurnanand Sanskrit University, Varanasi.
 2004. Awadh Ratna, by the Awadh Vikas Parishad, Allahabad.
 2006. Sanskrit Mahamahopadhyay, awarded by the Hindi Sahitya Sammelan, Prayag.
 2013. Purvanchal Ratna.
2015. Padma Vibhushan, India's second highest civilian honour, awarded by the Government of India.
 2015. Yash Bharati, awarded by the Government of Uttar Pradesh.
 2015. Vishva Bharati, awarded by the Government of Uttar Pradesh.

References

Works cited

External links

Lists of awards received by person